Juan Sumulong Memorial Junior College, commonly abbreviated as JSMJC, is an elementary to secondary educational institution located in Taytay, Rizal, Philippines.

It is part of the Juan Sumulong Memorial Schools System, which includes its constituent schools: Angono Private High School (Angono, Rizal), Angono Private High School (Binangonan, Rizal Extension), and Sumulong Memorial High School (Antipolo, Rizal).

History
On September 2, 1945, a group of citizens in the Philippines took a step toward recovery from the destruction brought on by World War II. The province of Rizal was among those worst affected in the areas of economy and agriculture. Education services in the region were limited.

After months of hard work, on July 1, 1946, the Juan Sumulong Memorial Schools System was formally inaugurated. The junior college was founded by Don Juan Sumulong in 1957.

Educational levels

Kindergarten
Elementary   (1-6)
Junior High  (7-10)
Senior High  (11-12)

Facilities
Office of the Director
Office of the Principal
Office of the Asst. Principals
Registrar's Office
Administrative Office
Office of the Prefect of Discipline
I.T. Office
Year-Level Faculty Rooms
Classrooms
Audio-Visual Room
Multi-Purpose Hall
Science Laboratory
Computer Laboratories
Speech Laboratory
T.L.E Practice House
School Library
School Clinic
Playground
Bookstore
Canteen
Stock Room
JSMJC Mini-Garden
JSMJC Senior High Building

Organizations

Cadet Officer Leadership Training (COLT)
Sumulong Dance Company (SDC)
JSMJC Drum and Lyre
JSMJC Glee
Juan Sumulong Artists' Group (JSAG)
Juan Sumulong Photography Experts Group (JPEG)
The Sumulong Advocate
JSMJC Talking Hands
JSMJC Varsity Team
Teatro Sumulong

High schools in Rizal
Taytay, Rizal
Elementary schools in the Philippines
1957 establishments in the Philippines
Educational institutions established in 1957